Rosemary De Angelis (April 26, 1933 – April 16, 2020) was an American stage, screen, and television actress.

Early life
Rosemary De Angelis was born on April 26, 1933 in Brooklyn, New York to Francis and Antoinette (née Donofrio) De Angelis.

Career 

De Angelis made her film debut at age 41 in Columbia Pictures' For Pete's Sake in 1974. She appeared in The Last Detail that same year and the PBS television special, Monkey, Monkey. In 1977, she played the role of the Mother in the play The Transformation of Benno Blimpie at the Astor Place Theatre in New York City. She won a Drama Desk Award for her performance.

In 1978, De Angelis was cast as Mrs. D'Amato on the NBC television series The Doctors. In 1979, she was in minor roles in the films Just Me and You and The Wanderers. In 1982, she played the recurring role of Millie on CBS' Baker's Dozen. In 1983, she played a welfare worker in the ABC television movie Enormous Changes at the Last Minute.

In 1985, De Angelis had two leading roles onstage,  Vera Vasilyevna in The Nest of the Woodgrouse at the New York Shakespeare Festival and the Kennedy Center, among other venues. She played Mistress Overdone in Measure for Measure at the Delacorte Theatre.

That same year, she appeared as Nina in Out of the Darkness. In 1986, she appeared as Jean Blake in the television show Another World and Mrs. Portman in the television show The Equalizer. In 1987, De Angelis appeared as Catherine Reardon in And Miss Reardon Drinks a Little at the Missouri Repertory Theatre in Kansas City, Missouri. In 1991, she guest-starred on Law & Order in the episode "Misconceptions" as Dr. Mishon. She returned for one episode on that show the next year.

In 1993, she appeared in the movie Household Saints. In 1994, she played the role of Aunt Vicky in Angie. In 1996, she played Mrs. Riggio in the film The Juror. In 1998, played Patsy Fortunato in the TV mini-series The Last Don II, and, in 2012, she appeared in "Domestic Disturbance" the second episode of the third season of the TV show Blue Bloods as Mrs. Goldfarb.

Filmography

Film

Television

References

1933 births
American stage actresses
Drama Desk Award winners
2020 deaths
20th-century American actresses
American film actresses
American television actresses
Actresses from New York City
People from Brooklyn
Place of death missing
21st-century American women